Down South Summit Meetin' (also released as First Meetin'  and Lightnin' Hopkins & The Blues Summit) is an album by the blues musicians Brownie McGhee, Lightnin' Hopkins, Big Joe Williams and Sonny Terry, recorded in 1960 and released on the World Pacific label.

Reception

AllMusic reviewer Stewart Mason called it "a well-lubricated studio jam session". The Penguin Guide to Blues Recordings awarded the album 3 stars, noting: "The atmosphere is charged with the electricity of several wiley old blues musicians topping each other's tricks. their occasionally, and perhaps not always entirely playfully, barbed sides add a whiff of brimstone. Altogether the performance tells us things about the four men that their other records don't generally convey, and anyone with a special fondness for any of the artists really aught to hear it".

Track listing
All compositions by Sam "Lightnin'" Hopkins except where noted
 "Ain't Nothin' Like Whiskey" – 7:50
 "Penitentiary Blues" (Traditional) – 5:08
 "If You Steal My Chickens, You Can't Make Em Lay" (Big Joe Williams) – 5:37
 "First Meeting" (Hopkins, Brownie McGhee) – 7:10
 "How Long Have It Been Since You Been Home?" – 4:10
 "Wimmin from Coast to Coast" – 5:46

Personnel

Performance
Brownie McGhee, Lightnin' Hopkins, Big Joe Williams – guitar, vocals
Sonny Terry – harmonica, vocals
Jimmy Bond – bass

Production
 Richard Bock, Ed Michel – producer

References

Brownie McGhee albums
Lightnin' Hopkins albums
Big Joe Williams albums
Sonny Terry albums
1961 albums
World Pacific Records albums
Albums produced by Richard Bock (producer)